Scott R. Dunlap (June 20, 1892 – March 30, 1970) was an American film producer, director, screenwriter, and actor.

Dunlap was born in Chicago, Illinois in 1892 and entered the film business in 1915. He produced 70 films between 1937 and 1960, and directed 47 films between 1919 and 1929.

In 1942, Dunlap was with Western star Buck Jones at the Cocoanut Grove fire in Boston, Massachusetts. Dunlap was hosting a party in Jones's honor at the nightclub. Jones died two days after the fire, while Dunlap was seriously hurt, but survived. Dunlap died in Los Angeles in 1970.

Selected filmography

 Vagabond Luck (1919) director
 Her Elephant Man (1920) director
 The Hell Ship (1920) director
 The Iron Rider (1920) director
 Twins of Suffering Creek (1920) director
 The Cheater Reformed (1921) director
 Bells of San Juan (1922)
 West of Chicago (1922) director
 Pawn Ticket 210 (1922) director
 Trooper O'Neill (1922) director
 The Footlight Ranger (1923) director
 Snowdrift (1923) director
 Traffic in Hearts (1924)
 One Glorious Night (1924)
 The Fatal Mistake (1924) director
 Beyond the Border (1925) director
 Silent Sanderson (1925) director
 The Texas Trail (1925) director
The Fearless Lover (1925) director
 Wreckage (1925) director
 Blue Blood (1925) director
 Driftin' Thru (1926) director
 Doubling with Danger (1926) director
 The Seventh Bandit (1926) director
 The Frontier Trail (1926) director
 Desert Valley (1926)
 Winning the Futurity (1926)
 The Better Man (1926) director
 Whispering Sage (1927) director
 Midnight Life (1928)
 Object: Alimony (1928) director
 Smoke Bellew (1929) director
 Luck of Roaring Camp (1937)
 The Marines Are Here (1938)
 The Mystery of Mr. Wong (1939)
 Streets of New York (1939)
 The Fatal Hour (1940)
 Doomed to Die (1940)
 The Old Swimmin' Hole (1940)
 Arizona Bound (1941)
 Road to Happiness (1942)
 Dawn on the Great Divide (1942)
 Flame of the West (1945)
 Border Bandits (1946)
Drifting Along  (1946)
 Trigger Fingers (1946) producer
 The Hunted (1948)
 Stampede (1949) producer
 Return from the Sea (1954)

References

External links

1892 births
1970 deaths
American film producers
American film directors
American male screenwriters
American male film actors
American male silent film actors
20th-century American male actors
20th-century American male writers
20th-century American screenwriters